The 2014 Virginia Cavaliers baseball team represents the University of Virginia in the 2014 NCAA Division I baseball season.   Head Coach Brian O'Connor is in his 11th year coaching the Cavaliers, who play their home games at Davenport Field.  They compete in the Atlantic Coast Conference's Coastal Division.

2014 was a very good year for Virginia baseball. The Cavaliers made their first trip to a College World Series Finals, where they were defeated in a best-of-three game series by Vanderbilt. UVA posted a 53–16 record – its fourth 50-win season in the last five years – winning the Charlottesville Regional and Super Regional en route to its third trip to Omaha in the last six seasons. As the tournament's No. 3 national seed, UVA won four games at the CWS in reaching the CWS championship game. Nathan Kirby earned First-Team All-America honors and was tabbed the Co-ACC Pitcher of the Year; he also was one of a record eight Cavaliers named to the All-ACC Team.

Pitching and defense propelled the Cavaliers, as UVA recorded the second-lowest ERA in program history (2.23) and the best fielding percentage in the school annals (.981). UVA ranked second nationally in ERA and fourth in fielding. Nick Howard set an ACC record with 20 saves and then was selected in the first round of the MLB Draft, one of eight Cavaliers to be drafted in 2014. Howard and Mike Papi joined Kirby as 2014 All-Americans.

Personnel

Roster

Coaches

Schedule 

! style="background:#f84b1e;color:#232d4b;"| Regular Season (43–11)
|- valign="top" 

|- align="center" bgcolor="ffdddd"
| Feb 14 || vs. Kentucky || No. 12 || Brooks Field • Wilmington, NC || L 3–8 || Reed (1–0) || Waddell (0–1) || None ||  || 0–1 || 
|- bgcolor="ddffdd"
| Feb 15 || vs. VMI || No. 12 || Brooks Field • Wilmington, NC || W 12–0 || Kirby (1–0) || Bach (0–1) || None ||  || 1–1 || 
|- bgcolor="ddffdd"
| Feb 16 || @  || No. 12 || Brooks Field • Wilmington, NC || W 7–2 || Sborz (1–0) || Phillips (0–1) || None || 3,826 || 2–1 || 
|- bgcolor="ddffdd"
| Feb 19 || @  || No. 9 || Plumeri Park • Williamsburg, VA || W 17–2 || Lewicki (1–0) || Kauhaahaa (0–1) || None || 845 || 3–1 || 
|- bgcolor="ddffdd"
| Feb 21 ||  || No. 9 || Davenport Field • Charlottesville, VA || W 3–2 || Kirby (2–0) || Hoffman (0–1) || Howard (1) || 3,092 || 4–1 || 
|- bgcolor="ddffdd"
| Feb 22 || East Carolina || No. 9 || Davenport Field • Charlottesville, VA || W 4–0 || Sborz (2–0) || Love (0–1) || None || 3,561 || 5–1 || 
|- bgcolor="ddffdd"
| Feb 23 || East Carolina || No. 9 || Davenport Field • Charlottesville, VA || W 6–2 || Waddell (1–1) || Lucroy (0–2) || None || 3,592 || 6–1 || 
|- align="center" bgcolor="ffdddd"
| Feb 25 || VMI || No. 6 || Davenport Field • Charlottesville, VA || L 2–3 || Henkel (1–0) || Mayberry (0–1) || Edens (1) || 2,689 || 6–2 || 
|-

|- bgcolor="ddffdd"
| Mar 1 ||  || No. 6 || Davenport Field • Charlottesville, VA || W 6–3 || Kirby (3–0) || McGee (1–1) || Jones (1) || 3,001 || 7–2 || 
|- bgcolor="ddffdd"
| Mar 2 || Monmouth || No. 6 || Davenport Field • Charlottesville, VA || W 5–3 || Sborz (3–0) || Hunt (0–2) || Howard (2) || 3,073 || 8–2 || 
|- bgcolor="ddffdd"
| Mar 2 || Monmouth || No. 6 || Davenport Field • Charlottesville, VA || W 6–26 || Waddell (2–1) || Singer (0–2) || None || 2,799 || 9–2 || 
|- bgcolor="ddffdd"
| Mar 8 || @  || No. 5 || Jack Coombs Field • Durham, NC || W 3–2 || Kirby (4–0) || Van Orden (1–1) || Howard (3) ||  || 10–2 || 1–0
|- align="center" bgcolor="ffdddd"
| Mar 8 || @ Duke || No. 5 || Jack Coombs Field • Durham, NC || L 2–3 || Istler (2–2) || Sborz (3–1) || Huber (3) || 882 || 10–3 || 1–1
|- bgcolor="ddffdd"
| Mar 9 || @ Duke || No. 5 || Jack Coombs Field • Durham, NC || W 2–1 || Waddell (3–1) || Marvel (1–2) || Howard (4) || 737 || 11–2 || 2–1
|- bgcolor="ddffdd"
| Mar 11 ||  || No. 5 || Davenport Field • Charlottesville, VA || W 13–2 || Connor (1–0) || Hoover (0–2) || None || 3,112 || 12–3 || 
|- bgcolor="ddffdd"
| Mar 14 ||  || No. 5 || Davenport Field • Charlottesville, VA || W 8–1 || Kirby (5–0) || Gorman (2–3) || None || 3,002 || 13–3 || 3–1
|- bgcolor="ddffdd"
| Mar 15 || Boston College || No. 5 || Davenport Field • Charlottesville, VA || W 3–2 || Howard (1–0) || Poore (0–2) || None || 3,351 || 14–3 || 4–1
|- bgcolor="ddffdd"
| Mar 15 || Boston College || No. 5 || Davenport Field • Charlottesville, VA || W 2–1 || Mayberry (1–1) || Stevens (0–3) || None || 3,228 || 15–3 || 5–1
|- bgcolor="#cccccc"
| Mar 18 ||  || No. 4 || Davenport Field • Charlottesville, VA ||colspan=7|Canceled
|- bgcolor="ddffdd"
| Mar 19 ||  || No. 4 || Davenport Field • Charlottesville, VA || W 5–3 || Rosenberger (1–0) || Patton (0–2) || Howard (5) || 2,567 || 16–3 || 
|- bgcolor="ddffdd"
| Mar 20 ||  || No. 4 || Davenport Field • Charlottesville, VA || W 14–4 || Bettinger (1–0) || Foote (0–2) || None || 2,670 || 17–3 || 
|- align="center" bgcolor="ffdddd"
| Mar 22 || @  || No. 4 || Mark Light Field at Alex Rodriguez Park • Coral Gables, FL || L 1–7 || Diaz (5–0) || Kirby (5–1) || Garcia (6) || 3,337 || 17–4 || 5–2
|- bgcolor="ddffdd"
| Mar 23 || @ Miami (FL) || No. 4 || Mark Light Field at Alex Rodriguez Park • Coral Gables, FL || W 8–311 || Jones (2–0) || Sosa (0–1) || Mayberry (1) || 2,812 || 18–4 || 6–2
|- bgcolor="ddffdd"
| Mar 24 || @ Miami (FL) || No. 4 || Mark Light Field at Alex Rodriguez Park • Coral Gables, FL || W 5–3 || Jones (3–0) || Garcia (2–2) || Howard (6) || 2,607 || 19–4 || 7–2
|- bgcolor="ddffdd"
| Mar 26 ||  || No. 4 || Davenport Field • Charlottesville, VA || W 8–1 || Bettinger (2–0) || Gould (1–1) || None || 2,737 || 20–4 || 
|- bgcolor="ddffdd"
| Mar 28 || Virginia Tech || No. 4 || Davenport Field • Charlottesville, VA || W 2–1 || Mayberry (2–1) || Markey (2–4) || Howard (7) || 3,414 || 21–4 || 8–2
|- bgcolor="ddffdd"
| Mar 29 || Virginia Tech || No. 4 || Davenport Field • Charlottesville, VA || W 9–2 || Jones (4–0) || Keselica (2–1) || None || 3,587 || 22–4 || 9–2
|- bgcolor="ddffdd"
| Mar 30 || Virginia Tech || No. 4 || Davenport Field • Charlottesville, VA || W 7–4 || Mayberry (3–1) || Kennedy (1–1) || Howard (8) || 3,730 || 23–4 || 10–2
|-

|- bgcolor="ddffdd"
| Apr 1 || Old Dominion || No. 3 || Davenport Field • Charlottesville, VA || W 7–1 || Bettinger (3–0) || Tomchick (1–1) || None || 3,422 || 24–4 || 
|- bgcolor="ddffdd"
| Apr 2 ||  || No. 3 || Davenport Field • Charlottesville, VA || W 10–0 || Lewicki (2–0) || Olson || None ||  || 25–4 || 
|- bgcolor="ddffdd"
| Apr 4 || @  || No. 3 || Petersen Sports Complex • Pittsburgh, PA || W 4–0 || Kirby (6–1) || Aldenhoven (2–2) || None || 402 || 26–4 || 11–2
|- align="center" bgcolor="ffdddd"
| Apr 5 || @ Pittsburgh || No. 3 || Petersen Sports Complex • Pittsburgh, PA || L 1–2 || Harris (3–3) || Jones (4–1) || None || 900 || 26–5 || 11–3
|- bgcolor="ddffdd"
| Apr 6 || @ Pittsburgh || No. 3 || Petersen Sports Complex • Pittsburgh, PA || W 3–0 || Waddell (4–1) || Wotherspoon (3–4) || Howard (9) || 900 || 27–5 || 12–3
|- bgcolor="ddffdd"
| Apr 8 || @  || No. 3 || Eagle Field at Veterans Memorial Park • Harrisonburg, VA || W 9–3 || Bettinger (4–0) || Garner (0–1) || None || 1,632 || 28–5 || 
|- bgcolor="ddffdd"
| Apr 11 || No. 22 Clemson || No. 3 || Davenport Field • Charlottesville, VA || W 3–2 || Kirby (7–1) || Crownover (6–3) || Howard (10) || 4,221 || 29–5 || 13–3
|- align="center" bgcolor="ffdddd"
| Apr 12 || No. 22 Clemson || No. 3 || Davenport Field • Charlottesville, VA || L 1–7 || Gossett (4–0) || Sborz (3–2) || None || 4,886 || 29–6 || 13–4
|- bgcolor="ddffdd"
| Apr 13 || No. 22 Clemson || No. 3 || Davenport Field • Charlottesville, VA || W 1–0 || Waddell (5–1) || Long (2–1) || Howard (11) || 4,840 || 30–6 || 14–4
|- bgcolor="#cccccc"
| Apr 15 ||  || No. 2 || Davenport Field • Charlottesville, VA ||colspan=7|Canceled
|- bgcolor="ddffdd"
| Apr 16 ||  || No. 2 || Davenport Field • Charlottesville, VA || W 11–2 || Lewicki (3–0) || Powers (0–1) || None || 2,969 || 31–6 || 
|- bgcolor="ddffdd"
| Apr 18 ||  || No. 2 || Davenport Field • Charlottesville, VA || W 3–2 || Kirby (8–1) || Thornton (7–2) || Howard (12) || 4,576 || 32–6 || 15–4
|- bgcolor="ddffdd"
| Apr 19 || North Carolina || No. 2 || Davenport Field • Charlottesville, VA || W 3–1 || Sborz (4–2) || Moss (2–2) || Howard (12) || 5,025 || 33–6 || 16–4
|- align="center" bgcolor="ffdddd"
| Apr 20 || North Carolina || No. 2 || Davenport Field • Charlottesville, VA || L 2–4 || Gallen (4–3) || Waddell (5–2) || Hovis (3) || 4,681 || 33–7 || 16–5
|- bgcolor="ddffdd"
| Apr 22 || @ VCU || No. 2 || The Diamond • Richmond, VA || W 4–510 || Howard (2–0) || Lees (5–3) || Mayberry (2) || 3,756 || 34–7 || 
|- bgcolor="ddffdd"
| Apr 23 ||  || No. 2 || Davenport Field • Charlottesville, VA || W 13–0 || Bettinger (5–0) || Baker (1–1) || None || 3,326 || 35–7 || 
|- bgcolor="ddffdd"
| Apr 25 || @ No. 6 Florida State || No. 2 || Mike Martin Field at Dick Howser Stadium • Tallahassee, FL || W 5–310 || Mayberry (4–1) || Smith (4–1) || Howard (14) || 4,852 || 36–7 || 17–5
|- align="center" bgcolor="ffdddd"
| Apr 26 || @ No. 6 Florida State || No. 2 || Mike Martin Field at Dick Howser Stadium • Tallahassee, FL || L 0–7 || Compton (4–1) || Sborz (4–3) || None || 5,572 || 36–8 || 17–6
|- bgcolor="ddffdd"
| Apr 27 || @ No. 6 Florida State || No. 2 || Mike Martin Field at Dick Howser Stadium • Tallahassee, FL || W 4–3 || Waddell (6–2) || Holtmann (5–1) || Howard (15) || 4,791 || 37–8 || 18–6
|- align="center" bgcolor="ffdddd"
| Apr 29 || @ Old Dominion || No. 1 || Harbor Park • Norfolk, VA || L 1–8 || Harris (1–1) || Lewicki (3–1) || None || 2,937 || 37–9 || 
|-

|- bgcolor="ddffdd"
| May 7 || No. 29  || No. 2 || Davenport Field • Charlottesville, VA || W 8–2 || Lewicki (4–1) || Lyons (2–4) || None || 4,354 || 38–9 || 
|- bgcolor="ddffdd"
| May 9 ||  || No. 2 || Davenport Field • Charlottesville, VA || W 4–3 || Young (1–0) || Heddinger (3–3) || Howard (16) || 4,040 || 39–9 || 19–6
|- bgcolor="ddffdd"
| May 10 || Georgia Tech || No. 2 || Davenport Field • Charlottesville, VA || W 4–311 || Mayberry (5–1) || Roberts (0–2) || None || 4,179 || 40–9 || 20–6
|- bgcolor="ddffdd"
| May 11 || Georgia Tech || No. 2 || Davenport Field • Charlottesville, VA || W 3–1 || Waddell (7–2) || Parr (4–3) || Howard (17) || 4,698 || 41–9 || 21–6
|- bgcolor="ddffdd"
| May 13 || VCU || No. 2 || Davenport Field • Charlottesville, VA || W 12–3 || Bettinger (6–0) || Kanuik (2–1) || None || 3,775 || 42–9 || 
|- align="center" bgcolor="ffdddd"
| May 16 || @  || No. 2 || Gene Hooks Field at Wake Forest Baseball Park • Winston-Salem, NC || L 5–610 || Dunshee (4–1) || Howard (2–1) || None ||  || 42–10 || 21–7
|- bgcolor="ddffdd"
| May 16 || @ Wake Forest || No. 2 || Gene Hooks Field at Wake Forest Baseball Park • Winston-Salem, NC || W 7–2 || Lewicki (5–1) || Pirro (2–2) || None || 1,213 || 43–10 || 22–7
|- align="center" bgcolor="ffdddd"
| May 17 || @ Wake Forest || No. 2 || Gene Hooks Field at Wake Forest Baseball Park • Winston-Salem, NC || L 3–4 || Tishman (1–2) || Waddell (7–3) || Dunshee (1) || 1,322 || 43–11 || 22–8
|-

|-
! style="background:#f84b1e;color:#232d4b;"| Post-Season (10–5)
|- 

|- align="center" bgcolor="ffdddd"
| May 22 || (6) Maryland || (3) No. 4 || NewBridge Bank Park • Greensboro, NC || L 6–7 || Stinnett (7–6) || Rosenberger (1–1) || Mooney (10) || 3,408 || 43–12 || 0–1
|- bgcolor="ddffdd"
| May 23 || (7)  || (3) No. 4 || NewBridge Bank Park • Greensboro, NC || W 3–2 || Mayberry (6–1) || Rice (2–3) || Howard (18) || 5,783 || 44–12 || 1–1
|- align="center" bgcolor="ffdddd"
| May 25 || (2) No. 6 Florida State || (3) No. 4 || NewBridge Bank Park • Greensboro, NC || L 4–6 || Smith (5–2) || Sborz (4–4) || Winston (7) || 5,298 || 44–13 || 1–2
|-

|- bgcolor="ddffdd"
| May 30 || (4)  || (1) No. 4 || Davenport Field • Charlottesville, VA || W 10–1 || Lewicki (6–1) || Hough (8–4) || None || 3,569 || 45–13 || 1–0
|- bgcolor="ddffdd"
| May 31 || (2) No. 23 Arkansas || (1) No. 4 || Davenport Field • Charlottesville, VA || W 3–0 || Kirby (9–1) || Killian (4–9) || Howard (19) || 4,579 || 46–13 || 2–0
|- bgcolor="ddffdd"
| June 1 || (2) No. 23 Arkansas || (1) No. 4 || Davenport Field • Charlottesville, VA || W 9–2 || Waddell (8–3) || Jackson (2–3) || None || 4,005 || 47–13 || 3–0
|-

|- align="center" bgcolor="ffdddd"
| June 7 || No. 13 Maryland || (3) No. 2 || Davenport Field • Charlottesville, VA || L 4–5 || Stinnett (8–6) || Kirby (9–2) || Mooney (13) || 5,001 || 47–14 || 3–1
|- bgcolor="ddffdd"
| June 8 || No. 13 Maryland || (3) No. 2 || Davenport Field • Charlottesville, VA || W 7–3 || Waddell (9–3) || Shawaryn (11–4) || Lewicki (1) || 5,001 || 48–14 || 4–1
|- bgcolor="ddffdd"
| June 9 || No. 13 Maryland || (3) No. 2 || Davenport Field • Charlottesville, VA || W 11–2 || Sborz (5–4) || Ruse (7–3) || None || 5,001 || 49–14 || 5–1
|-

|- bgcolor="ddffdd"
| June 15 || No. 4 Ole Miss || (3) No. 1 || TD Ameritrade Park • Omaha, NE || W 2–1 || Lewicki (7–1) || Greenwood (3–2) || None || 23,393 || 50–14 || 1–0
|- bgcolor="ddffdd"
| June 17 || (7) No. 2 TCU || (3) No. 1 || TD Ameritrade Park • Omaha, NE || W 3–2  || Lewicki (8–1)  || Teakell (6–1) || None  || 24,285 || 51–14 || 2–0
|- bgcolor="ddffdd"
| June 21 || No. 4 Ole Miss || (3) No. 1 || TD Ameritrade Park • Omaha, NE || W 4–1 || Sborz (6–4) || Ellis (10–3) || Howard (20) || 22,924 || 52–14 || 3–0
|- align="center" bgcolor="ffdddd"
| June 23 || No. 5 Vanderbilt || (3) No. 1 || TD Ameritrade Park • Omaha, NE || L 8–9 || Miller (7–2) || Kirby (9–3) || Ravenelle (2) || 20,755 || 52–15 || 3–1
|- bgcolor="ddffdd"
| June 24 || No. 5 Vanderbilt || (3) No. 1 || TD Ameritrade Park • Omaha, NE || W 7–2 || Waddell (10–3) || Beede (8–8) || None || 24,308 || 53–15 || 4–1
|- align="center" bgcolor="ffdddd"
| June 25 || No. 5 Vanderbilt || (3) No. 1 || TD Ameritrade Park • Omaha, NE || L 2–3 || Stone (4–0) || Howard (2–2)''' || Ravenelle (3) ||18,344 || 53–16 || 4–2
|-

Ranking Movements

References

Virginia Cavaliers
Virginia Cavaliers baseball seasons
College World Series seasons
Virginia Cavaliers baseball
Virginia